Yosano, Kyoto is a town in Japan.

Yosano may also refer to:
, Japanese author, wife of Tekkan Yosano
, Japanese politician, grandson of Akiko and Tekkan Yosano
, Japanese author, husband of Akiko Yosano